The Demographics of Greece refer to the demography of the population that inhabits the Greek peninsula.

Historical overview
Greece was inhabited as early as the Paleolithic period. Prior to the 2nd millennium BC, the Greek peninsula was inhabited by various pre-Hellenic peoples, the most notable of which were the Pelasgians. The Greek language ultimately dominated the peninsula and Greece's mosaic of small city-states became culturally similar. The population estimates on the Greeks during the 4th century BC, is approximately 3.5 million on the Greek peninsula and 4 to 6.5 million in the rest of the entire Mediterranean Basin, including all colonies such as those in Magna Graecia, Asia Minor and the shores of the Black Sea.

During the history of the Byzantine Empire, the Greek peninsula was occasionally invaded by the foreign peoples like Goths, Avars, Slavs, Normans, Franks and other Romance-speaking peoples who had betrayed the Crusades. The only group, however, that planned to establish permanent settlements in the region were the Slavs. They settled in isolated valleys of the Peloponnese and Thessaly, establishing segregated communities that were referred by the Byzantines as Sclaveni. Traces of Slavic culture in Greece are very rare and by the 9th century, the Sclaveni in Greece were largely assimilated. However, some Slavic communities managed to survive in rural Macedonia. At the same time a large Sephardi Jewish emigrant community from the Iberian peninsula established itself in Thessaloniki, while there were population movements of Arvanites and "Vlachs" (Aromanians and Megleno-Romanians), who established communities in several parts of the Greek peninsula. The Byzantine Empire ultimately fell to Ottoman Turks in the 15th century and as a result Ottoman colonies were established in the Balkans, notably in Macedonia, the Peloponnese and Crete. Many Greeks either fled to other European nations or to geographically isolated areas (i.e. mountains and heavily forested territories) to escape foreign rule. For those reasons, the population decreased in the plains, while increasing on the mountains. The population transfers with Bulgaria and Turkey that took place in the early 20th century, added in total some two million Greeks to the demography of the Greek Kingdom.

During the next decades, the population of Greece continued to increase, except during a large part of 1940s due to World War II and subsequent events. After 1940s the population of Greece continued to grow, though on a decreased pace after 1960s, due to a gradual decrease in fertility and emigration to various countries, such as West Germany, Australia, United Kingdom and many others. The birth rate decreased significantly in 1980s, while in 1987 the Greek population surpassed 10 million. At this time Greece had started to appear a positive migration rate, due to the return of Greek Civil War refugees and international immigration. During the nineties the population increased by close a million, as the collapse of the communist governments in Eastern Europe and the economic downturn resulted in a significant influx of Eastern European immigrants in Greece and especially from the Balkans, including many Greeks living in these countries. In 2000s the population continued to increase reaching 11 million, thanks to an increased birth rate, a stable influx of migrants from other countries and the return of Greeks from United States, Germany, Australia and other countries. In the 2010s, in the wake of the Greek financial crisis, the population started to decrease and birthrates plummeted, while death rates increased due to an aging population. Many Greeks emigrated abroad, while more recently the population decrease has been largely stabilized due to foreign immigration.

Population

According to the 2001 census the population of Greece was 10,964,020. Eurostat estimations as of January 2008 gave the number of 11,214,992 inhabitants in the Greek peninsula. According to the official 2011 census, which used sophisticated methodology, the population of Greece was 10,816,286.

By region
Greece is divided into nine geographic regions. The population of each region according to the 2001, 2011 and 2021 censuses is represented in the graph below, comparing the change in population over a 20 year period.

Note: data for 2021 consists of the preliminary census results (August 2022)

Fertility rate
The total fertility rate is the number of children born per woman. It is based on fairly good data for the entire period. Sources: Our World In Data and Gapminder Foundation.

Life expectancy

Source: UN World Population Prospects

Age structure
Being part of the phenomenon of the aging of Europe, the Greek population shows a rapid increase of the percentage of the elderly people. Greece's population census of 1961 found that 10.9% of the total population was above the age of 65, while the percentage of this group age increased to 19.0% in 2011. In contrast, the percentage of the population of the ages 0–14 had a total decrease of 10.2% between 1961 and 2011.

Vital statistics from 1921

Source: Hellenic Statistical Authority and World Bank. The "average population" data for the period 2001 to 2021 was calculated by +/- the growth rate (gathered from the World Bank) of each consecutive year to the previous year, starting from year 2000.

Current vital statistics

Other demographic statistics
Demographic statistics according to the World Population Review in 2019.

One birth every 6 minutes	
One death every 4 minutes
Net loss of one person every 21 minutes	
One net migrant every 53 minutes		

Demographic statistics according to the CIA World Factbook, unless otherwise indicated.

Population10,718,565 (Jan 2020 est.)
10,761,523 (July 2018 est.)
10,768,477 (July 2017 est.)
10,768,193 (Jan 2017 est.)

Age structure
0-14 years: 14.53% (male 794,918/female 745,909)
15-24 years: 10.34% (male 577,134/female 519,819)
25-54 years: 39.6% (male 2,080,443/female 2,119,995)
55-64 years: 13.1% (male 656,404/female 732,936)
65 years and over: 22.43% (male 1,057,317/female 1,322,176) (2020 est.)

0-14 years: 13.83% (male 767,245/female 722,313)
15-24 years: 9.67% (male 532,179/female 509,487)
25-54 years: 42.45% (male 2,275,984/female 2,295,082)
55-64 years: 13.13% (male 692,420/female 721,641)
65 years and over: 20.91% (male 986,816/female 1,265,310) (2017 est.)

0–14 years: 14.2% (male 787,143/female 741,356)
15–64 years: 66.2% (male 3,555,447/female 3,567,383)
65 years and over: 19.6% (male 923,177/female 1,185,630) (2011 est.)

Median age
total: 45.3 years. Country comparison to the world: 9th
male: 43.7 years
female: 46.8 years (2020 est.)

total: 44.5 years
male: 43.5 years
female: 45.6 years (2017 est.)

total: 42.5 years
male: 41.4 years
female: 43.6 years (2011 est.)

Mother's mean age at first birth
29.9 years (2017 est.)

Total fertility rate
1.39 children born/woman (2021 est.) Country comparison to the world: 225th

Population growth rate
-0.34% (2021 est.) Country comparison to the world: 221st

Birth rate
7.72 births/1,000 population (2021 est.) Country comparison to the world: 222nd
8.4 births/1,000 population (2017 est.)

Death rate
12.05 deaths/1,000 population (2021 est.) Country comparison to the world: 14th

Net migration rate
0.97 migrant(s)/1,000 population (2021 est.) Country comparison to the world: 62nd

Life expectancy at birth
total population: 81.28 years. Country comparison to the world: 41st
male: 78.73 years
female: 84 years (2021 est.)

Infant mortality rate
total: 3.61 deaths/1,000 live births. Country comparison to the world: 204th
male: 4 deaths/1,000 live births
female: 3.19 deaths/1,000 live births (2021 est.)

Ethnic groups
population: Greek 91.6%, Albanian 4.4%, other 4% (2011)
Note: data represent citizenship, since Greece does not collect data on ethnicity

Dependency ratios
total dependency ratio: 56.1
youth dependency ratio: 21.3
elderly dependency ratio: 34.8
potential support ratio: 2.9 (2020 est.)

Religions
Greek Orthodox (official) 81–90%, Muslim 2%, other 3%, none 4–15%, unspecified 1% (2015 est.)

Urbanization
urban population: 79.7% of total population (2020)
rate of urbanization: 0.22% annual rate of change (2015–20 est.)

Unemployment, youth ages 15–24
total: 39.9%. Country comparison to the world: 11th
male: 36.4%
female: 43.9% (2018 est.)

School life expectancy (primary to tertiary education)
total: 20 years
male: 20 years
female: 20 years (2018)

Immigration

Greece has received a large number of immigrants since the early 1990s. The majority of them come from the neighbouring countries. As of 2011, the number of foreigners in an enumerated total of 10,815,197 people was 911,299.

Foreign-born by country (Eurostat):

Non-registered immigration
Greece has received many illegal immigrants beginning in the 1990s and continuing during the 2000s and 2010s. Migrants make use of the many islands in the Aegean Sea, directly west of Turkey. A spokesman for the European Union's border control agency said that the Greek-Albanian border is "one of Europe's worst-affected external land borders." Migrants across the Evros region bordering Turkey face land-mines. Principal illegal immigrants include Albanians, Indians, Kurds, Afghans, Iraqis and Somalis.

Ethnic groups, languages and religion

The population of northern Greece has primarily been ethnically, religiously and linguistically diverse.
The Muslim minority of Greece is the only explicitly recognized minority in Greece by the government. The officials define it as a group of Greek Muslims numbering 98,000 people, consisting of Turks (50%), Pomaks (35%) and Romani (15%). No other minorities are officially acknowledged by the government. There is no official information for the size of the ethnic, linguistic and religious minorities because asking the population questions pertaining to the topic have been abolished since 1951.

Minorities in Greece according to Minority Rights Group International:
Roma/Gypsies: 160,000–250,000
Vlachs (Aromanians and Megleno-Romanians): 200,000
Macedonian Slavs: 100,000–300,000
Arvanites: 95,000
Turks: 90,000
Pomaks: 35,000

The official language of Greece is Greek, spoken by almost all as a second language at least. Additionally, there are a number of linguistic minority groups that are bilingual in a variety of non-Greek languages, and parts of these groups identify ethnically as Greeks.

Languages spoken in Greece:

According to the Greek constitution, Eastern Orthodox Christianity is recognized as the "prevailing religion" in Greece. During the centuries that Greece was part of the Ottoman Empire, besides its spiritual mandate, the Orthodox Church, based in Constantinople (present-day Istanbul), also functioned as an official representative of the Christian population of the empire. The Church is often credited with the preservation of the Greek language, values, and national identity during Ottoman times. The Church was also an important rallying point in the war for independence against the Ottoman Empire, although the official Church in Constantinople initially condemned the breakout of the armed struggle in fear of retaliation from the Ottoman side. The Church of Greece was established shortly after the formation of a Greek national state. Its authority to this day extends only to the areas included in the independent Greek state before the Balkan Wars of 1912–1913. There is a Muslim minority concentrated in Thrace and officially protected by the Treaty of Lausanne (1923). Besides Pomaks (Muslim Bulgarian speakers) and Roma, it consists mainly of ethnic Turks, who speak Turkish and receive instruction in Turkish at special government-funded schools. There are also a number of Jews in Greece, most of whom live in Thessaloniki. There are also some Greeks who adhere to a reconstruction of the ancient Greek religion. A place of worship has been recognized as such by court.

Education

Greek education is free and compulsory for children between the ages of 5 and 15. English study is compulsory from first grade through high school. University education, including books, is also free, contingent upon the student's ability to meet stiff entrance requirements. A high percentage of the student population seeks higher education. More than 100,000 students are registered at Greek universities, and 15% of the population currently holds a university degree. Admission in a university is determined by state-administered exams, the candidate's grade-point average from high school, and his/her priority choices of major. About one in four candidates gains admission to Greek universities.

Greek law does not currently offer official recognition to the graduates of private universities that operate in the country, except for those that offer a degree valid in another European Union country, which is automatically recognized by reciprocity. As a result, a large and growing number of students are pursuing higher education abroad. The Greek Government decides through an evaluation procedure whether to recognize degrees from specific foreign universities as qualification for public sector hiring. Other students attend private, post-secondary educational institutions in Greece that are not recognized by the Greek Government. At the moment extensive public talk is made for the reform of the Constitution to recognize private higher education in Greece as equal with public and to place common regulations for both.

The number of Greek students studying at European institutions is increasing along with EU support for educational exchange. In addition, nearly 5,000 Greeks are studying in the United States, about half of whom are in graduate school. Greek per capita student representation in the US (one every 2,200) is among the highest in Europe.

See also
Demographic history of Greece
Turks of Western Thrace
Minorities in Greece
Aging of Europe
Albanian immigrants in Greece

Notes

References

External links
General Secretariat of National Statistical Service of Greece 
The World Factbook

 
Society of Greece